The thoracic spinal nerve 3 (T3) is a spinal nerve of the thoracic segment.

It originates from the spinal column from below the thoracic vertebra 3 (T3).

References

Spinal nerves